John Edwards (September 15, 1831 – March 11, 1891) was an American politician born in England.

Born in England, Edwards moved with his family in 1832 to Hazel Green, Wisconsin. He went to California; he then moved to Port Edwards, Wisconsin, where he was a lumberman. He served as school treasurer, chairman of the Town of Port Edwards, and chairman of the Wood County, Wisconsin Board of Supervisors from 1884 to 1885. He served in the Wisconsin State Assembly as a Democrat in 1891. He died in Madison, Wisconsin while still in office.

Notes

1831 births
1891 deaths
People from Hazel Green, Wisconsin
People from Wood County, Wisconsin
Businesspeople from Wisconsin
County supervisors in Wisconsin
19th-century American politicians
19th-century American businesspeople
Democratic Party members of the Wisconsin State Assembly